The Dayton Triangles were an original franchise of the American Professional Football Association (now the National Football League (NFL)) in 1920. The Triangles were based in Dayton, Ohio, and took their nickname from their home field, Triangle Park, which was located at the confluence of the Great Miami and Stillwater Rivers in north Dayton. They were the longest-lasting traveling team in the NFL (1920–1929), and the last such "road team" until the Dallas Texans in 1952, who, coincidentally, descended from the Dayton franchise. 

The Texans players and assets were moved to Baltimore in 1953, and then to Indianapolis in 1983, where they now operate as the Colts, just 117 miles west of their origin. They have kept their color scheme through the years and, ultimately, have never missed an NFL season in some form.

Origins
The original Dayton Triangles members first began playing together as basketball players at St. Mary's College, now the University of Dayton, from 1908 until 1912. After graduation, the players organized a basketball team of alumni, students, and other local athletes. They went by the name of the St. Mary's Cadets. The Cadets claimed the title of "World Basketball Champions" by defeating the Buffalo German Ramblers.

In the fall of 1913, the St. Marys Cadets organized a football team. The team was coached by Louis Clark, who coached the St. Mary's college football team as well. Al Mahrt was elected team captain. The team finished its first season with a 7–0 record and won the Dayton City Championship. It also won the Southern Ohio Championship by defeating the Cincinnati Celts 27–0 at Redland Park. The team won a second city championship in 1914, despite injuries to Al Mahrt and Babe Zimmerman. In 1915 the team changed its name to the Dayton Gym-Cadets after their presumed sponsors, the Dayton Gymnastic Club. That season saw Al Marhrt take over as the team's coach. The team only lost one game that season, to the Columbus Panhandles. It also won its third city championship.

1916–1919
The team was reorganized in 1916 as a recreational football team from among the employees of three downtown Dayton factories: the Dayton Engineering Laboratories Company (or Delco), the Dayton Metal Products Company, and the Domestic Engineering Company (now called Delco-Light). Carl Storck, who later served as treasurer of the NFL and as acting league president from 1939 to 1941,  co-sponsored the Dayton Cadets  and used players recruited from the three factories to fill out the team roster. Storck would later become the team's manager, while Bud Talbott, a Walter Camp All-American tackle and team captain at Yale University, was named the team's coach. The team's name was also changed to the Dayton Triangles that season.

In 1916, the Triangles went 9–1, defeating teams from Cincinnati, Detroit, Toledo and Pittsburgh. The Canton Bulldogs, with the legendary Jim Thorpe in the line-up, claimed the "Ohio League" Championship after their win over the Massillon Tigers. The Triangles challenged the Bulldogs to a game on December 10, 1916, but the game was never played. The following season saw the Triangles move into their new park, Triangle Park. The team's 1917 campaign was successful. The team went 6–0–2 that season. The Triangles were able to score 188 points and gave up only 13 to their opponents.

1918 Championship
1918 saw the United States entry in World War I, as well as the devastating Spanish flu pandemic. While the Triangles lost players to military service, they also had many kept home with regular jobs in industries deemed essential to the war effort and, along with the few other teams still playing, far less competition for the talent pool. This allowed the Triangles to keep a team on the field and beat what few representative teams remained and eventually claiming an Ohio League Championship. The Triangle player-coach that season was Earle "Greasy" Neale, since Bud Talbott joined the army. During their championship run, the Triangles defeated future NFL teams, the Toledo Maroons, Hammond Pros, Columbus Panhandles and Detroit Heralds. The Triangles went 8–0–0 in 1918, one of two known teams to have collected a perfect record of more than five games that year, the other being the Buffalo Niagaras, whose 6–0–0 record was collected as a result of playing only teams from Buffalo and who built their team on many of the players left out of work because of the Ohio League teams' suspension. In 1919, they followed up their championship with a season record of 4–2–1.

National Football League (NFL) era

At the first meetings held on August 20, 1920 and September 17, 1920 at Ralph Hay's Hupmobile dealership located in Canton, Ohio, the Triangles were represented by their manager Carl Storck as they became charter members of the new league called the American Professional Football Association (APFA), until 1922 when it was renamed the National Football League. During the latter meeting, Jim Thorpe was unanimously elected as the new league's president. Also at this meeting, a membership fee of $100 per team was established, however George Halas stated that none of the charter teams ever paid it.

On October 3, 1920, the Triangles won what could be considered the very first APFA/NFL game, with a 14–0 defeat of the Columbus Panhandles at Triangle Park. The high point of the Triangles' 1920 season was a 20–20 tie at Triangle Park with Thorpe's Canton Bulldogs; it was the first time a team had scored three touchdowns on the Bulldogs since 1915. Trailing the Triangles, 20–14, Thorpe nailed two late field goals to tie the score. Six games into the season, the Triangles remained undefeated (4–0–2) but in the final three games lost twice to the eventual league champion, the Akron Pros, ending 1920 with a 5–2–2 mark.

Decline
In 1922, the other teams in the NFL were recruiting and signing top college players from around the country; however Dayton continued to use mainly local players. This marked a decline in the team's performance, and the Triangles ceased being competitive in the NFL. Because of their poor showing on the field, the Triangles were not able to draw crowds for home games: Triangle Park, with a seating capacity of 5,000, rarely saw that many fans. Soon, the combination of poor home gates and the lure of $2,500 guarantees to play at larger venues (like Wrigley Field, Comiskey Park and the Polo Grounds), made the Triangles primarily a traveling team. 

By the late twenties, Dayton was one of the league's doormats, winning just five of their 51 NFL contests from 1923 through 1929. Only the revenues from playing on the road kept them afloat.  Also around this time, the NFL began shaking off its roots in mid-sized midwestern cities. Although the Triangles were one of only three original NFL teams (along with the Bears and Cardinals) to survive the 1920s, and the only team from the Ohio League to survive past 1926, it soon became apparent that Dayton was not big enough to support a team in the burgeoning league.  Finally, on July 12, 1930, a Brooklyn-based syndicate headed by Bill Dwyer bought the Triangles; the franchise moved to Brooklyn and was renamed the Brooklyn Dodgers. Jack Depler was a co-owner and new coach of the Dodgers who had been a coach-player for the NFL's Orange Tornadoes. He took most of the members of the 1929 Tornadoes with him for the new Dodgers team.

Lineage
Due to numerous transactions over the years, the Triangles have a tenuous connection to the current NFL.

The Dodgers merged with the Boston Yanks franchise for the 1945 season due to player shortages. In 1946, Brooklyn's owner jumped to the AAFC and played as the New York Yankees, while the Boston Yanks remained in the NFL.

In 1949, the Yanks moved to New York and became the New York Bulldogs, while the AAFC Yankees merged with the Brooklyn Dodgers and played as the Brooklyn-New York Yankees. When the AAFC merged with the NFL in 1950, the Yankees players were divided between the New York Giants and the New York Bulldogs, the latter of whom were renamed the New York Yanks.

Due to heavy financial losses, the Yanks were sold back to the NFL in 1952 and awarded to a group from Texas, who moved them to Dallas for the 1952 season as the Dallas Texans.

The Texans were again sold back to the NFL midway through the season, and in 1953, their players were awarded to an ownership group in Baltimore and continued to play as the (new) Baltimore Colts. The Colts moved to Indianapolis in 1984 and are still playing as the Indianapolis Colts.

In spite of the unbroken continuity of the franchises that began with the Triangles in 1913 and the Boston Yanks from 1944, the NFL and the Colts organization currently do not consider the Colts to be a continuation of the Triangles or any other franchise.

Teams named after the football Triangles
During the 1970s, the Dayton Triangles Soccer Club revived the name and enjoyed some success and recognition as a successful youth (and later semi-pro) soccer club. Like the football team, they took their name from the same city park and played an important role in development of soccer in the Miami Valley.

In 1973, the Dayton Triangles RFC club was founded.  Like the aforementioned soccer club, this team also took its name from the original football team and city park. Through various amalgamations over the years, the club is still active under the name of the Dayton Area Rugby Club.

Pro Football Hall of Famers

Season-by-season

Notes

References

External links
Dayton Triangles fan website

 
Defunct National Football League teams
American football teams in Dayton, Ohio
Defunct American football teams in Ohio
1913 establishments in Ohio
1929 disestablishments in Ohio
American football teams established in 1913
American football teams disestablished in 1929